The Best of Michael Jackson is a compilation of American singer and recording artist Michael Jackson's greatest hits and was released by his former record company Motown on August 28, 1975 (just one day before Jackson's 17th birthday). It peaked at number 44 on the U.S. R&B albums chart.

Track listing

Tracks 1, 6, 7 from Got to Be There. Track 2 from Ben. Tracks 3, 4, 9, 10 from Music & Me. Tracks 5, 8 from Forever, Michael.

Charts

Weekly charts

Year-end charts

References

1975 greatest hits albums
Michael Jackson compilation albums
Albums produced by Hal Davis
Motown compilation albums
Albums produced by Bob Gaudio
Albums produced by Berry Gordy
Albums produced by the Corporation (record production team)
Albums produced by Brian Holland